The Pakistan national cricket team toured South Africa from 20 November 2013 to 30 November 2013. The tour included three One Day Internationals (ODIs) and two Twenty20 Internationals (T20I) between South Africa cricket team and Pakistan. The Twenty20 series was drawn 1-1 while Pakistan won the ODI series 2-1. This was Pakistan's first ever ODI series win over South Africa and became the first Asia team to beat the Proteas in an away series.

Squads

T20I series

1st T20I

2nd T20I

ODI series

1st ODI

2nd ODI

3rd ODI

References

International cricket competitions in 2013–14
2013–14 South African cricket season
2013-14
2013 in South African cricket
2013 in Pakistani cricket